Curia (Latin plural curiae) in ancient Rome referred to one of the original groupings of the citizenry, eventually numbering 30, and later every Roman citizen was presumed to belong to one. While they originally likely had wider powers, they came to meet for only a few purposes by the end of the Republic: to confirm the election of magistrates with imperium, to witness the installation of priests, the making of wills, and to carry out certain adoptions.

The term is more broadly used to designate an assembly, council, or court, in which public, official, or religious issues are discussed and decided.  Lesser curiae existed for other purposes. The word curia also came to denote the places of assembly, especially of the senate. Similar institutions existed in other towns and cities of Italy.

In medieval times, a king's council was often referred to as a curia. Today, the most famous curia is the Curia of the Roman Catholic Church, which assists the Roman Pontiff in the hierarchical government of the Church.

Origins
The word curia is thought to derive from Old Latin coviria, meaning "a gathering of men" (co-, "together" =vir, "man").  In this sense, any assembly, public or private, could be called a curia.  In addition to the Roman curiae, voting assemblies known as curiae existed in other towns of Latium, and similar institutions existed in other parts of Italy.  During the republic, local curiae were established in Italian and provincial municipia and coloniae.  In imperial times, local magistrates were often elected by municipal senates, which also came to be known as curiae.  By extension, the word curia came to mean not just a gathering, but also the place where an assembly would gather, such as a meeting house.

Roman Curiae
In Roman times, "curia" had two principal meanings.  Originally it applied to the wards of the comitia curiata.  However, over time the name became applied to the senate house, which in its various incarnations housed meetings of the Roman senate from the time of the kings until the beginning of the seventh century AD.

Comitia Curiata

The most important curiae at Rome were the 30 that together made up the comitia curiata.  Traditionally ascribed to the kings, each of the three tribes established by Romulus, the Ramnes, Tities, and Luceres, was divided into ten curiae.  In theory, each gens (family, clan) belonged to a particular curia, although whether this was strictly observed throughout Roman history is uncertain.

Each curia had a distinct name, said to have been derived from the names of some of the Sabine women abducted by the Romans in the time of Romulus.  However, some of the curiae evidently derived their names from particular districts or eponymous heroes.  The curiae were probably established geographically, representing specific neighborhoods in Rome, for which reason curia is sometimes translated as "ward".  Only a few of the names of the 30 curiae have been preserved, including Acculeia, Calabra, Faucia, Foriensis, Rapta, Veliensis, Tifata, and Titia.

The assertion that the plebeians were not members of the curiae, or that only the dependents (clients) of the patricians were admitted, and not entitled to vote, is expressly contradicted by Dionysius.  This argument is also refuted by Mommsen.

Each curia had its own sacra, in which its members, known as curiales, worshipped the gods of the state and other deities specific to the curia, with their own rites and ceremonies.  Each curia had a meeting site and place of worship, named after the curia. Originally, this may have been a simple altar, then a sacellum, and finally a meeting house.

The curia was presided over by a curio (plural, curiones), who was always at least 50 years old, and was elected for life.  The curio undertook the religious affairs of the curia.  He was assisted by another priest, known as the flamen curialis.  When the 30 curiae gathered to make up the comitia curiata, they were presided over by a curio maximus, who until 209 BC was always a patrician.  Originally, the curio maximus was probably elected by the curiones, but in later times by the people themselves.  Each curia was attended by one lictor; an assembly of the comitia curiata was attended by thirty lictors.

The comitia curiata voted to confirm the election of magistrates by passing a law called the lex curiata de imperio.  It also witnessed the installation of priests, and adoptions, and the making of wills.  The Pontifex Maximus may have presided over these ceremonies.  The assembly probably possessed much greater authority before the establishment of the comitia centuriata, which gradually assumed many of the curiate assembly's original functions.

Senate House
Since the Roman Kingdom, the meeting-house of the Roman senate was known as the curia.  The original meeting place was said to have been a temple built on the spot where the Romans and Sabines laid down their arms during the reign of Romulus (traditionally reigned 753–717 BC).  The institution of the senate was always ascribed to Romulus; although the first senate was said to comprise 100 members, the earliest number which can be called certain is 300, probably connected with the three tribes and 30 curiae also attributed to Romulus.

Curia Hostilia

After the original temple was destroyed by fire, it was replaced by a new meeting house by Tullus Hostilius, the third King of Rome (traditionally reigned 673–642 BC).  The Curia Hostilia stood on the north end of the comitium, where the comitia curiata and other Roman assemblies met, and was oriented along the four cardinal points.  After more than 500 years of service, the building was restored and enlarged by the dictator Lucius Cornelius Sulla in 80 BC.  Sulla had doubled the senate's membership from 300 to 600, necessitating a larger building, which retained the original orientation of the Curia Hostilia, but extended further south into the comitium.  In 52 BC, following the murder of Publius Clodius Pulcher, his clientes set fire to the senate house, which was rebuilt by Faustus Cornelius Sulla, son of the dictator.  Following this reconstruction, the building came to be called the Curia Cornelia.

Curia Julia

A generation after Sulla enlarged the senate from 300 members to 600, Julius Caesar increased its membership to 900, necessitating the construction of a larger meeting house.  The Curia Cornelia was demolished, and shortly before his death in 44 BC, Caesar began the construction of a new building, which became known as the Curia Julia.  This structure covered most of the comitium, and abandoned the original orientation of the previous curiae, pointing slightly northwest.  The building featured a large central hall with a daïs for magistrates, and marble benches on one side.  There was also a record office on one side.  The building was completed by Caesar's grandnephew, Octavian, the future emperor Augustus, in 29 BC, although he reduced the senate itself to its former number of 600.

In AD 94, the Curia Julia was rebuilt along Caesar's original plan by the emperor Domitian, who also restored the former orientation of the Curia Hostilia.  The building was damaged by fire during the reign of Carinus in 283, and again restored under his successor, Diocletian.  The Roman Senate is last mentioned in AD 600.  In 630, Pope Honorius I transformed the senate house into the church of Sant'Adriano al Foro, preserving the structure at its full height.  In 1923, the church and an adjacent convent were bought by the Italian government.  The building was further restored from 1935 to 1937, removing various medieval additions, to reveal the original Roman architecture.

Curiae Veteres
The Curiae Veteres was the earliest sanctuary of the thirty curiae. It is discussed by both Varro and by Tacitus, who mentions it as one point of the Palatine pomerium of Roma quadrata.  It is likely that this shrine was located at the northeast corner of the Palatine Hill. Its remains have likely been identified in excavations carried out by Clementina Panella.  As the Republic continued, the curiae grew too large to meet conveniently at the Curiae Veteres, and a new meeting place, the Curiae Novae, was constructed.  A few of the curiae continued to meet at the Curiae Veteres due to specific religious obligations.

Municipal curiae

In the Roman Empire a town council was known as a curia, or sometimes an ordo, or boule.  The existence of such a governing body was the mark of an independent city.  Municipal curiae were co-optive, and their members, the decurions, sat for life. Their numbers varied greatly according to the size of the city.  In the Western Empire, one hundred seems to have been a common number, but in the East five hundred was customary, on the model of the Athenian Boule.  However, by the fourth century, curial duties had become onerous, and it was difficult to fill all the posts; often candidates had to be nominated.  The emperor Constantine exempted Christians from serving in the curiae, which led to many rich pagans claiming to be priests in order to escape these duties.

Other curiae
The concept of the curia as a governing body, or the court where such a body met, carried on into medieval times, both as a secular institution, and in the church.

Medieval Curiae

In medieval times, a king's court was frequently known as the curia regis, consisting of the king's chief magnates and councilors.  In England, the curia regis gradually developed into Parliament.  In France, the curia regis or Conseil du Roi developed in the twelfth century, with the term gradually becoming applied to a judicial body, and falling out of use by the fourteenth century.

Roman Catholic Church

In the Roman Catholic Church, the administrative body of the Holy See is known as the Roman Curia.  It is through this Curia that the Roman Pontiff conducts the business of the Church as a whole.

Modern usage

The Court of Justice of the European Union uses "CURIA" (in roman script) in its official emblem.

The term curia may refer to separate electoral colleges in a system of reserved political positions (reserved seats), e.g. during the British mandate of Palestine at the third election (1931) of the Asefat HaNivharim there were three curiae, for the Ashkenazi Jews, the Sephardi Jews and for the Yemeni Jews.

In the United States Supreme Court an interested third party to a case may file a brief as an amicus curiae.

Under the Fundamental Law adopted in 2011, Hungary's supreme court is called the Curia.

The Federal Palace of Switzerland, the seat of the Swiss Confederation, bears the inscription Curia Confœderationis Helveticæ.

See also
Constitution of the Roman Republic
Bouleuterion
Altar of Victory

References

Further reading
 Bond, Sarah E. 2014.“Curial Communiqué: Memory, Propaganda, and the Roman Senate House” In Aspects of Ancient Institutions and Geography: Studies in Honor of Richard J.A. Talbert. Impact of Empire, 19. Edited by Lee L. Brice and Daniëlle Slootjes. Leiden: Brill,  84-102.
 Crofton-Sleigh, Lissa. 2018. "The Curia in Aeneid 7." Illinois Classical Studies 43.1.
 Gorski, Gilbert J. and James E. Packer. 2015. The Roman Forum: A Reconstruction and Architectural Guide.  New York: Cambridge University Press.
 Heinzelmann, Michael. 2011. "The Imperial Building Complex of S. Maria Antiqua in Rome: An Incomplete Senate Building of Domitian?" Anales de Arqueología Cordobesa, 21-22: 57–80.
 Millar, Fergus. 1989. “Political Power in Mid-Republican Rome. Curia or Comitium?.” The Journal of Roman Studies LXXIX, 138–150.
 Santangeli Valenzani, Riccardo. 2006. “The Seat and Memory of Power: Caesar's Curia and Forum.” In Julius Caesar in Western Culture. Edited by Maria Wyke. Oxford: Blackwell, 85–94.

External links

 

 
Roman law
Roman Senate